Dongmen is a town and the county seat in Luocheng Mulao Autonomous County, Guangxi, China.

Administrative division
As of 2021, the town is divided into 5 communities and 16 villages:
Fenghuang Community
Shizishan Community
Baima Community
Wulixiang Community
Qiaotou Community
Chongdong
Dajing
Sanjia
Yantang
Dafu
Le'e
Guyao
Deyin
Pingluo
Zhangluo
Yong'an
Fengwu
Heng'an
Zhongshi
Youdong
Dongyong
Nongda
Longshan
Rongmu

History
Luocheng Mulao Autonomous County was controlled by the People's Liberation Army (PLA) on 23 November 1949 and Dongmen became county seat. It was renamed "Dongmen Township" in 1952. The Dongmen People's Commune was established in 1968. In November 1984, Dongmen People's Commune was revoked and split into two townships, namely Dongmen Township and Qiaotou Township. The two townships were merged and was officially renamed "Dongmen Town" in October 1991. In August 2005, Qiaotou Town was formally merged into the town.

Geography
The town lies at the southeastern of Luocheng Mulao Autonomous County, bordering Siba Town to the west, Liucheng County to the south, Huangjin Town to the north, and Xiaochang'an Town to the east.

Climate

Economy
The town's economy is based on agricultural resources and commerce. The main crops are rice and corn. Sugarcane and cassava are the economic plants of the town. Livestock husbandry mainly focuses on raising pigs, cattle and poultry.

Demographics

In 2019, Dongmen had a total population of 101,483 over the whole town.

Tourist attractions
The Martyrs' Cemetery is a popular attraction in the town, which was built in 1957 at the foot of Phoenix Mountain to commemorate Zou Yanzhao and Yang Guanghui and other 12 Communist martyrs.

The Kaiyuan Temple is a Buddhist temple in the town and has been designated as a county level cultural relic preservation organ.

Transportation
The town is crossed by the Chaluo railway.

The  passes across the town.

Two public parks are located in the town: Chenglonghu Park and Luocheng Park.

References

Bibliography

Divisions of Luocheng Mulao Autonomous County